Frederick Threlfall (7 January 1880 – ?) was an English footballer who played for Manchester City, Fulham and Leicester City F.C. His career began in 1898 with Manchester City but he did not make regular first team appearances until the 1901–1902 season. After eight goals in 74 appearances across all competitions, he moved to Fulham in 1907.

Threlfall went on to appear in 107 matches for the South London club, scoring on 19 occasions. Two years later he moved to Leicester City, where he turned out 56 times for the club and scoring 10 times.

He retired from football in 1911.

References

1880 births
Footballers from Preston, Lancashire
English footballers
Fulham F.C. players
Manchester City F.C. players
Leicester City F.C. players
English Football League players
Association football midfielders
Year of death missing